Jean Holden (born February 2, 1940 in Masonville, Arkansas) is an American contemporary jazz singer and vocal coach, who has been called Toledo's First Lady of Song.

References

Further reading
 Toledo singer Jean Holden working as vocal coach for musical, 'Hair'
 Son, daughter to join songstress in concert

1940 births
Living people
American vocal coaches
Singers from Arkansas
American women jazz singers
American jazz singers
20th-century American singers
20th-century American women singers
21st-century American singers
21st-century American women singers
Jazz musicians from Arkansas